Rio is a village in Knox County, Illinois, United States. The population was 220 at the 2010 census. It is part of the Galesburg Micropolitan Statistical Area.

Rio is pronounced "Rye-Oh".

Geography
The village, like its other rural neighbors, has rich soil ideal for farming corn and soybeans. A few very small creeks run through its outskirts. None of them are formally named. There are a few small hills that coast under the streets of the village, and there are a few sizable dropoffs throughout the land that almost look like shallow or gradual cliffs as some of the local agricultural fields are rolling and steep. The land drains to North Henderson Creek, a west-flowing stream which runs via Henderson Creek to the Mississippi River near Oquawka.

Demographics

As of the census of 2000, there were 240 people, 94 households, and 72 families residing in the village. The racial makeup of the village was 99.58% White, 0.42% from other races. Hispanic or Latino of any race were 2.08% of the population.

There were 94 households, out of which 35.1% had children under the age of 18 living with them, 70.2% were married couples living together, 5.3% had a female householder with no husband present, and 23.4% were non-families. 20.2% of all households were made up of individuals, and 8.5% had someone living alone who was 65 years of age or older. The average household size was 2.55 and the average family size was 2.92.

In the village, the population was spread out, with 24.2% under the age of 18, 4.2% from 18 to 24, 32.1% from 25 to 44, 22.1% from 45 to 64, and 17.5% who were 65 years of age or older. The median age was 38 years. For every 100 females, there were 101.7 males. For every 100 females age 18 and over, there were 102.2 males.

The median income for a household in the village was $37,750, and the median income for a family was $40,750. Males had a median income of $35,625 versus $21,250 for females. The per capita income for the village was $17,181. None of the families and 2.0% of the population were living below the poverty line.

Education

ROWVA School District #208 is made up of five major towns: Rio, Oneida, Wataga, Victoria, and Altona. PreK-2nd graders go to ROWVA Central in Oneida, 3rd and 4th graders attend ROWVA West in Wataga, and 5th and 6th graders go to ROWVA East in Altona. The junior high is located in Oneida and is made up of 7th and 8th graders. The high school made up of 9th-12th graders and is also located in Oneida. ROWVA Central, ROWVA Jr. High, and ROWVA High School are all in one basic building, just different sections. ROWVA's school colors are black, gold, and white, with their mascot being a tiger. The school is ending a five-year-long football co-op with AlWood at the end of the 2009 football season, in which they are the A&R Bulldogs (black, silver, and white.) Starting in the 2009 fall season, ROWVA is also part of a sports co-op with Galva where they are the Mid-County Cougars (black, blue, and white.) ROWVA is a part of the Mid-County co-op for golf, cross country, junior high football, and will be adding high school football starting in the 2010 football season.

Rio was previously home to its own elementary school, which most humbly stands in the center of town; near the corner of Grande Avenue and North Main Street. It was opened in 1922. Due to its  devastating energy costs, and lack of efficient output of students(36 students at date of closing for grades 1–6), coupled with other reasons, it was shut down for good in 2004.  The building was purchased by Mike Gillette, who agreed to let local children utilize the modest and rusty playground equipment (which has since been removed) as a makeshift park. It has not been transformed into any business, and virtually no architectural or exterior changes have been made to it.

The village of Rio owns a baseball diamond and the land plot to its west and have turned it into a park with a public pavilion and concession stand for ballgames as well as a large playground structure that was paid for by the village and constructed during a community build day in July 2012.

References

Villages in Knox County, Illinois
Villages in Illinois
Galesburg, Illinois micropolitan area